Li Yingying (李莹莹) is a Chinese cricketer who plays for China women's national cricket team.

A right-arm off-spin bowler, Li starred for China in the ICC Women's World Cup Asia Qualifier 2016 in Hong Kong on 11 October 2016, by taking 5–12 against Nepal.  Two days later, on 13 October 2016, she took 3–16 in China's match against previously unbeaten Thailand, in which China registered its first win of the tournament.

The following month, Brisbane Heat signed Li as its Associate Rookie for the Women's Big Bash League Twenty20 competition's WBBL02 season in 2016–17.

References

External links

Chinese women cricketers
Living people
Brisbane Heat (WBBL) cricketers

Year of birth missing (living people)